Dan-Axel Zagadou (born 3 June 1999) is a French professional footballer who plays as a centre-back for Bundesliga club VfB Stuttgart. He has represented France from under-16 to under-21 levels.

Club career

Early career
Zagadou began his career playing at junior level for hometown club US Créteil, before signing for Paris Saint-Germain at the age of 12 in 2011. He then spent the next five seasons developing in PSG's academy, before being assigned to the reserve squad in 2016, where he made 9 appearances in the CFA.

Borussia Dortmund
On 5 June 2017, German club Borussia Dortmund announced the signing of Zagadou on a free transfer and a five-year contract. On 28 October 2017, he scored his first goal for Dortmund in a 4–2 away loss against Hannover 96, where he also received his first red card in the 59th minute.

On 12 May 2022, it was announced that Zagadou's contract would not be renewed and that he was to become a free agent.

VfB Stuttgart
On 19 September 2022, Zagadou signed a four-year contract with VfB Stuttgart.

International career
Zagadou has represented France at U16, U17, U18, U19, U20 and U21 levels.

Personal life
Born in France, Zagadou is of Ivorian descent.

Career statistics

Honours

Borussia Dortmund
 DFB-Pokal: 2020–21
 DFL-Supercup: 2019

Individual
 UEFA European Under-17 Championship Team of the Tournament: 2016

References

External links

 
 
 Dan-Axel Zagadou on Borussia Dortmund's official website
 
 

1999 births
Living people
Sportspeople from Créteil
French footballers
Black French sportspeople
French sportspeople of Ivorian descent
France youth international footballers
France under-21 international footballers
Association football defenders
Borussia Dortmund players
Borussia Dortmund II players
VfB Stuttgart players
Championnat National 2 players
Bundesliga players
Regionalliga players
3. Liga players
French expatriate footballers
Expatriate footballers in Germany
French expatriate sportspeople in Germany
Footballers from Val-de-Marne